|}

The Lismullen Hurdle is a Grade 2 National Hunt hurdle race in Ireland which is open to horses aged four years or older. It is run at Navan over a distance of about 2 miles and 4 furlongs (4,023 metres), and it is scheduled to take place each year in November.

The event was formerly restricted to amateur jockeys, and it used to be contested in mid-December. For a period its distance was 2 miles and 5 furlongs. It ceased to be an amateur race in 1991, and at the same time it was cut by 2 furlongs. Its present length was introduced in 1992, and two years later it was given Grade 3 status and moved to early November. The race was promoted to Grade 2 level in 1997.

Records
Most successful horse (3 wins):
 Cloughtaney – 1988,1989,1990

Leading jockey (5 wins):
 Charlie Swan – Trapper John (1991), Novello Allegro (1992), Urubande (1996), Le Coudray (1999), Liss A Paoraigh (2001)
 Paul Carberry -  Novello Allegro (1993), Limestone Lad (2002), Rosaker (2003, 2006), Aitmatov (2009)

Leading trainer (7 wins):
 Noel Meade -  Novello Allegro (1992, 1993), Cockney Lad (1997), Rosaker (2003, 2006), Aitmatov (2009), Snow Falcon (2013)

Winners since 1988

See also
 Horse racing in Ireland
 List of Irish National Hunt races

References
 Racing Post:

 pedigreequery.com – Lismullen Hurdle – Navan.

National Hunt races in Ireland
National Hunt hurdle races
Navan Racecourse